Maurice Wilk was a well-known American violinist who performed as a member of the Alma Trio from 1953 until his sudden death in 1963.

He was the  original violinist in the  Bach Aria Group during the late 1940s. The other original members of the Bach Aria Group were Bernard Greenhouse (Cello); Menahem Pressler (Piano); and  Robert Bloom (oboe). During the 1950s he was a faculty member at Columbia University in New York City.

In memory of Wilk, Otto Luening wrote the Elegy for violin solo 4'.

See also
 Wilk – people with the surname Wilk

References

Online database 
   Altenberg Trio Ensemble Database, Vienna

Selected discography 
  Recordings of Bach Cantatas & Other Vocal Works
  Cantata BWV 68: Also hat Gott die Welt geliebt
  The Art of Robert Bloom, Vol. One
 The Art of Robert Bloom, Vol. One and Two
   The 20th Century Concert Hall, Vol.2, CBS Radio Orchestra with Maurice Wilk, violin and Julius Baker, flute - February 7, 1954; LP recording
  CD-1187(12) Casals Festival at Prades with Maurice Wilk, violin, Vol 2, CD 1
 A complete listing of recordings with violinist Maurice Wilk in LP format, are listed on the Alma Trio page. These recordings of works by Beethoven, Brahms, and Schubert, are cataloged by the  Library of Congress.

Other citations 
  1955 Poster: Vintage Booking Ad

External links 

 Death Notice in Columbia Spectator (February 18, 1963)

American classical violinists
Male classical violinists
American male violinists
1963 deaths
Year of birth missing